Shay Roundtree (born November 23, 1977 in Augusta, Georgia) is an American actor.

Early life
Roundtree began his early training as an actor by joining drama clubs in his native hometown, Augusta, Georgia. He began his formal training as an actor at the Augusta Mini Theatre under the direction of Tyrone Butler and Judith Simon-Butler. After graduating from T. W. Josey High School in 1996, he went into pro acting.

While still attending college, Roundtree made his screen debut in the movie Drumline, starring Nick Cannon, Orlando Jones and Zoe Saldana. That movie, which was released in 2002, along with a television commercial appearance, qualified him to be a member of the Screen Actors Guild.

After attending college for three years at Clark Atlanta University, Roundtree decided to pursue his acting career full-time. He got into his 1987 Nissan Maxima (with 258,000 miles on it) and drove to Los Angeles to follow his dream. Three months after his arrival in the city, he auditioned and won the role of Junie Gatling on NBC's Kingpin.

Filmography

References

External links

Shay Rountree Website

Living people
American male film actors
Male actors from Augusta, Georgia
1977 births